Janq'u Qalani (Aymara janq'u white, qala stone, -ni a suffix, "the one with the white stone", also spelled Jankho Khalani) is a mountain in the Bolivian Andes which reaches a height of approximately . It is located in the La Paz Department, Pacajes Province, Coro Coro Municipality. Janq'u Qalani lies on the bank of the Ch'alla Jawira ("sand river").

References 

Mountains of La Paz Department (Bolivia)